Phanaeng, also spelled phanang, panang, and other variants) is a type of red Thai curry that is thick, salty and sweet, with a zesty makrut lime flavour. The earliest known mention of phanaeng appears in Mom Somchin Rachanupraphan's book Tamra Kap Khao (ตำรากับข้าว), published in 1890.

A popular phanaeng curry dish is pork phanaeng. In Thailand, this curry is usually eaten with rice.

Phanaeng curry paste

The curry paste is made with dried chili peppers, galangal, lemongrass, makrut lime zest, coriander root, coriander seeds, cumin seeds, garlic, shallot, shrimp paste, salt and peanuts. The dish is usually made with meat cut into thin strips, makrut lime leaves, coconut milk, phanaeng curry paste, palm sugar and fish sauce. It typically contains thick coconut milk and has very little other liquid added.

References

Thai curries
Food paste